Presle is a commune in the Savoie department, Auvergne-Rhône-Alpes, southeastern France.

See also
Communes of the Savoie department

References

Communes of Savoie